Isaac Donkor may refer to:

 Isaac Donkor (footballer, born 1991), Ghanaian footballer
 Isaac Donkor (footballer, born 1995), Ghanaian footballer